The Utopian was a unique English automobile created in 1914.  Built by the Utopian Motor Works of Leicester, the car was powered by a two-cylinder water-cooled engine mounted under its seat. There was a side tiller to assist in steering.  Only one car is believed to have been made, for a local clergyman; the company did, however, manufacture bicycles with some success.

See also
 List of car manufacturers of the United Kingdom
List of motorized trikes

External links
Utopian at 3wheelers

Defunct motor vehicle manufacturers of England
Defunct cycle manufacturers of the United Kingdom
Cars of England
Manufacturing companies based in Leicester